"In the Pines", also known as "Where Did You Sleep Last Night?", "My Girl" and "Black Girl", is a traditional American folk song originating from two songs, "In the Pines" and "The Longest Train", both of whose authorship is unknown and date back to at least the 1870s. The songs originated in the Southern Appalachian area of the United States in the contiguous areas of East Tennessee and Kentucky, Western North Carolina and Northern Georgia.

Versions of the song have been recorded by many artists in numerous genres, but it is most often associated with American bluegrass musician Bill Monroe and American blues musician Lead Belly, both of whom recorded very different versions of the song in the 1940s and 1950s.

In 1964, a version of the song by English Beat music group the Four Pennies reached the top-twenty in the United Kingdom. A live rendition by American grunge band Nirvana, based on Lead Belly's interpretation, was recorded during their MTV Unplugged performance in 1993, and released the following year on their platinum-selling album, MTV Unplugged in New York.

Early history
Like numerous other folk songs, "In the Pines" was passed on from one generation and locale to the next by word of mouth. In 1925, a version of the song was recorded onto phonograph cylinder by a folk collector. This was the first documentation of "The Longest Train" variant of the song, which includes a verse about "The longest train I ever saw". This verse probably began as a separate song that later merged into "In the Pines". Lyrics in some versions about "Joe Brown's coal mine" and "the Georgia line" may refer to Joseph E. Brown, a former Governor of Georgia, who famously leased convicts to operate coal mines in the 1870s. While early renditions which mention the head in the "driver's wheel" make clear that the decapitation was caused by the train, some later versions would omit the reference to the train and reattribute the cause. As music historian Norm Cohen pointed out in his 1981 book, Long Steel Rail: The Railroad in American Folksong, the song came to consist of three frequent elements: a chorus about "in the pines", a verse about "the longest train" and a verse about a decapitation, but not all elements are present in all versions.

Starting in 1926, commercial recordings of the song were made by various country artists. In her 1970 Ph.D. dissertation, Judith McCulloh found 160 permutations of the song. As well as rearrangement of the three frequent elements, the person who goes into the pines, or who is decapitated, is described as a man, woman, adolescent, husband, wife, or parent, while the pines can be seen as representing sexuality, death, or loneliness. The train is described as killing a loved one, as taking one's beloved away, or as leaving an itinerant worker far from home.

The folk version by the Kossoy Sisters asks, "Little girl, little girl, where'd you stay last night? Not even your mother knows." The reply to the question, "Where did you get that dress/ And those shoes that are so fine?" from one version is, "From a man in the mines/Who sleeps in the pines."

Cover versions

Bill Monroe
Bill Monroe's 1941 and 1952 recordings, both under the title "In the Pines", were highly influential on later bluegrass and country versions. Recorded with his Bluegrass Boys and featuring fiddles and yodelling, they represent the "longest train" variant of the song, and omit any reference to a decapitation. However, as Eric Weisbard writes in a 1994 article in The New York Times, "...the enigmatic train is almost as frightening, suggesting an eternal passage: 'I asked my captain for the time of day/He said he throwed his watch away.'"

Lead Belly
Due to the popularity of Lead Belly's versions, he is often erroneously cited as the song's author, such as by Kurt Cobain, who introduced Nirvana's 1993 MTV Unplugged rendition as being by his "favorite performer," then telling an anecdote about attempting to purchase Lead Belly's guitar. According to the American folklorist Alan Lomax, Lead Belly learned the song from an interpretation of the 1917 version compiled by Cecil Sharp, and by the 1925 phonograph recording.

Mark Lanegan/Nirvana

Kurt Cobain of Nirvana played guitar on the version that appears on Mark Lanegan's 1990 album The Winding Sheet. It is likely that Cobain drew from Lead Belly's 1944 Musicraft version for his interpretation of the song; Lanegan owned an original 78 rpm record of this version, and it is the one that Cobain's version most closely resembles in terms of form, title and lyrics, including the "Shiver for me" interjection before the instrumental verse. In a 2009 MTV article, Kurt Loder remembers discussing the song's title with Cobain, with Cobain insisting, "But the Leadbelly version is called 'Where Did You Sleep Last Night,'" and Loder preferring the "In the Pines" title used by Bill Monroe (as well as Lead Belly).

The first officially released version by Nirvana was recorded during the band's MTV Unplugged appearance, on November 18, 1993, at Sony Music Studios in New York City. This version was originally sanctioned to be released, under the title "Where Did You Sleep Last Night (In the Pines)," as a b-side to the band's "Pennyroyal Tea" single in 1994, but the single was cancelled following Cobain's death in April 1994. It was instead posthumously released as simply "Where Did You Sleep Last Night" on the band's MTV Unplugged in New York album in November 1994, and as a promotional single from the album, receiving some airplay on US rock and alternative radio in 1994-95. The song also received some airplay in Belgium and France, and in Australia.

Reception
Nirvana's MTV Unplugged version of the song has earned Cobain acclaim from critics and other musicians and artists. In 1994, American poet Allen Ginsberg recalled that "a couple weeks ago, one of my students gave me a mixed tape of Kurt Cobain and there was a version of 'Black Girl' of great artistry. Great vocal control and subtlety, it's almost as good as Leadbelly's." Canadian musician Neil Young described Cobain's vocals during the final screamed verse as "unearthly, like a werewolf, unbelievable." In 2013, Andrew Wallace Chamings of The Atlantic wrote that "it ranks among the greatest single rock performances of all time." The show's producer, Alex Coletti, recalled Cobain declining his suggestion to perform an encore after "Where Did You Sleep Last Night," which was the final song of the set, telling him that “I don’t think we can top the last song," at which point Coletti relented.

Other versions
King Oliver's Creole Jazz Band recorded Where Did You Stay Last Night? in 1923, the b-side to Dippermouth Blues.
Norma Tanega recorded a version under the title "Hey Girl" on her 1966 album Walkin' My Cat Named Dog.
Dolly Parton's version appears on her 1994 album Heartsongs: Live from Home.
Carl Rutherford recorded a version on his 2001 album, Turn Off the Fear
Bill Callahan (as Smog) recorded a version on his 2005 album A River Ain't Too Much to Love.
Laura Gibson's version appears as a b-side on her single 2012 La Grande.
Kid Cudi and Dot da Genius, collectively known as WZRD, recorded a rendition of the song for their 2012 self-titled debut album.
Fantastic Negrito recorded his rendition of the song for his 2016 album, The Last Days of Oakland.
Jake Blount's version appears on his 2020 debut solo album, Spider Tales.
 Forbidden Dimension included a rockabilly version on their 1993 album, Sin Gallery.
 Caught A Ghost released the track as a non-album single in 2019.

In popular culture

Literature
 In 2007, Czech-American writer-singer Natálie Kocábová used a strophe of "Where Did You Sleep Last Night" for the opening of her novella Růže: Cesta za světlem... ("Rose: A Way to the Light").

Games
A rendition by Jared Emerson-Johnson and Janel Drewis is played during the closing credits of The Walking Dead: Season Two - Episode 2: A House Divided released in 2014.
A version of the song, as of yet unidentified, can be found playing in certain parts of the Ubisoft video game Far Cry 5, released on March 27, 2018.

Film and TV
In The Defenders, an instrumental version of Nirvana's cover of the song plays in the cold open of episode 7, "Fish in the Jailhouse"
In Blindspotting (2018), a version by Fantastic Negrito plays during the protagonist Collin's first day out of probation.
Another version appears in the fashion brand Diesel’s 2020 TV commercial, Francesca, directed by Francois Rousselet. The story follows the journey of a young Italian student, assigned male at birth (played by transgender model Harlow Monroe), who transitions into a woman and ultimately becomes a Christian nun.
The movie Girl ends with "The Pines" playing during the credits.
A version by Brian Reitzell appears in the TV series American Gods.
A version by Wanda Davis appears in episode 8 of season 1 of the TV series Bad Sisters.
A portion of the Nirvana Unplugged recording is played in the BBC drama serial Happy Valley series 3 episode 4.
In Coal Miner's Daughter (1980 Film), Sissy Spacek as Loretta Lynn sings the song while taking a walk through the woods of Butcher Hollow, KY before being interrupted by a gunshot from nearby hunters.

See also
 List of train songs

References

External links

In the Pines novella at Spiral Publishing, Ltd.

1870s songs
Appalachian folk songs
Lead Belly songs
Live singles
Nirvana (band) songs
Songs about trains